= Abu the Flutemaker =

American musician

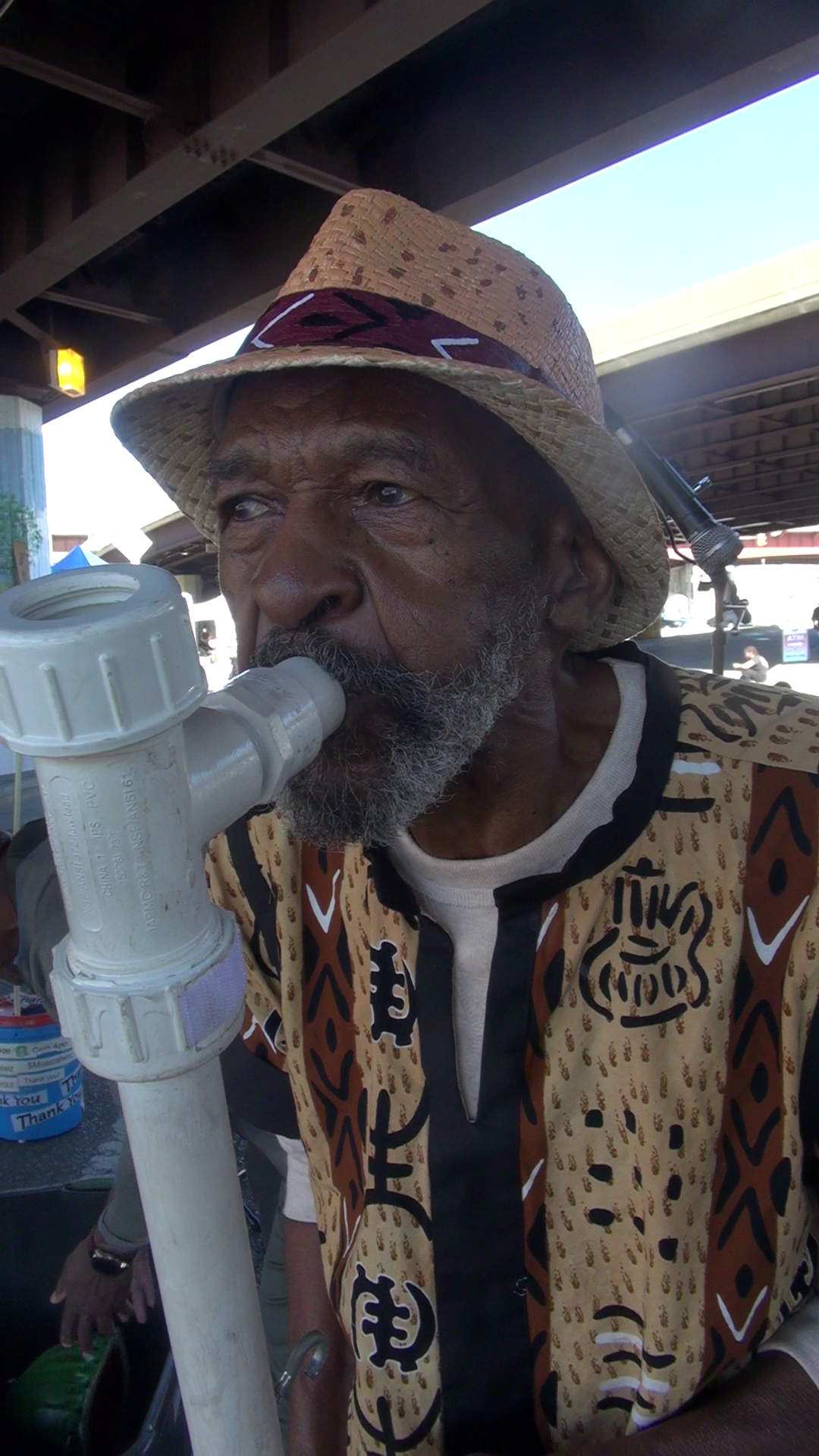
Abu the Flutemaker in Baltimore, MD

Abu the Flutemaker (born William Emerson) is an American street musician in Baltimore who has been crafting instruments and playing music for almost 50 years as of 2024. He often recycles found objects into musical instruments. Many of his instruments are used for instruction at schools. In 2020, he was listed as Baltimore's best street performer by the Baltimore Sun.
